Mount Wells is a massive ice-covered mountain in the Prince Olav Mountains, standing at the west side of Liv Glacier, about  northwest of June Nunatak. It was named by the Advisory Committee on Antarctic Names for Harry Wells, Executive Secretary of the Committee on Polar Research, US National Academy Sciences, 1962–66.

References
 

Mountains of the Ross Dependency
Dufek Coast